The rufous-winged woodpecker (Piculus simplex) is a species of bird in subfamily Picinae of the woodpecker family Picidae. It is found in Costa Rica, Honduras, Nicaragua and Panama.

Taxonomy and systematics

The rufous-winged woodpecker was originally described as Chloronerpes simplex. Since its inclusion in Piculus it has at times been considered conspecific with the stripe-cheeked woodpecker (P. callopterus), the white-throated woodpecker (P. leucolaemus), and the Lita woodpecker (P. litae); the four may form a superspecies. The rufous-winged woodpecker is monotypic but at times part of the Honduran population has been proposed as a subspecies.

Description

Males and females have the same plumage except on their heads. Males are red from forehead to hindneck and very widely on the malar (cheek); the rest of its face is brownish green. The female's head is mostly brownish olive with red only on the nape and hindneck. Adults of both sexes have bronze-green upperparts. Their flight feathers are mostly cinnamon-rufous with much dark olive on the webs. Their tail is blackish with a hint of cinnamon-rufous on the outer feathers. Their throat and upper breast are olive-green; the upper breast has pale buffish yellow spots. The rest of their underparts are pale yellow-buff with dark olive bars. Their shortish beak is blackish with a paler gray mandible, their iris pale bluish or yellowish to white, and the legs olive to grayish. Juveniles are duller, grayer, and greener; their throat and breast have buffish green spots, and their underparts' barring is uneven. Males have red only from the rear crown to the hindneck.

Distribution and habitat

The rufous-winged woodpecker is found from eastern Honduras through Nicaragua and Costa Rica into western Panama. It inhabits humid forest but sometimes ventures to isolated large trees in open areas nearby.

Behavior

Movement

The rufous-winged woodpecker is a year-round resident throughout its range.

Feeding

The rufous-winged woodpecker usually forages alone, but sometimes in pairs and occasionally as part of a mixed species feeding flock. It forages at most levels of the forest, favoring the interior. It mostly feeds by pecking into the substrate. Its diet includes ants and adult and larval beetles.

Breeding

The rufous-winged woodpecker's breeding season is from February to May. The clutch size is two to four eggs. The incubation period, time to fledging, and details of parental care are not known.

Vocal and non-vocal sounds

The rufous-winged woodpecker's song is "a vigorous, jay-like chea, chea, chea, chea" also described as a "loud, emphatic series of slightly nasal downslurred 'heew' notes. It drums "in long bursts".

Status

The IUCN has assessed the rufous-winged woodpecker as being of Least Concern. It has a large range and an estimated population of at least 50,000 mature individuals, though the latter is believed to be decreasing. No immediate threats have been indentified. It is considered "uncommon to fairly common" and occurs in two protected areas in Costa Rica.

References

rufous-winged woodpecker
Birds of Honduras
Birds of Nicaragua
Birds of Costa Rica
Birds of Panama
rufous-winged woodpecker
rufous-winged woodpecker
Taxonomy articles created by Polbot